Chicureo Airport is an airport in the town of Chicureo (es),  north of Santiago, in the Santiago Metropolitan Region of Chile.

There is mountainous and high terrain in all quadrants except to the west.

See also

Transport in Chile
List of airports in Chile

References

External links
OpenStreetMap - Chicureo
OurAirports - Chicureo
FallingRain - Chicureo Airport

Airports in Chile
Airports in Santiago Metropolitan Region